Warragamba Power Station is a hydroelectric power station at Warragamba Dam, New South Wales, Australia. Warragamba has one turbine with a generating capacity of 50 MW of electricity.

The power station was approved in 1953, completed in 1959 and is now disconnected from the electricity grid.

References

External links 

Eraring Energy page on 

Energy infrastructure completed in 1959
Hydroelectric power stations in New South Wales